Charaxes monteiri is a rare tropical butterfly of the family Nymphalidae, belonging to the Charaxinae subfamily or leafwing butterflies. It was described by Otto Staudinger in 1885.

Description
Charaxes monteiri presents an important sexual dimorphism, as do most species of the genus Charaxes. The male has a black-brown and blue wing, while the female has a brown wing with a wide white stripes on each side and a smaller one on top.
Description in Seitz- Ch. monteiri Stgr. The male is very similar above to that of  smaragdalis, only differing in having the distal blue spots in cellules 2—7 of the forewing much larger and sagittate and the transverse band on the hindwing anteriorly narrower and posteriorly completely united with the marginal line. Forewing beneath light grey-blue at the base and before the distal margin. In the female the forewing is black-brown above, with broad white transverse band and two white subapical spots; the hindwing above umber-brown, towards the distal margin somewhat lighter and with 8 large, angled, blue-centred, black submarginal spots and a black marginal line, thickened between the veins. Only occurring on the island of St. Thome.

Distribution and habitat
This species is endemic to the island of São Tomé in the archipelago of São Tomé and Principe (Gulf of Guinea). It can be found in the mountain peaks of volcanic origin.

Biology
Adults mainly feed on rotting fruits.

Taxonomy
It is considered part of the Charaxes tiridates group.

References

Further reading
  Henning (S.), 1989 - The Charaxinae Butterflies of Africa, pp. 1–457 
  Turlin (B.), 2005-2007 - Butterflies of the World. Parts 22, 25, 28, 32, Charaxes 1-4 
Victor Gurney Logan Van Someren, 1971 Revisional notes on African Charaxes (Lepidoptera: Nymphalidae). Part VII. Bulletin of the British Museum (Natural History) (Entomology) 181-226.
 Zipcodezoo

External links

 Thais
 Golden Map
Charaxes montieri images at Consortium for the Barcode of Life
 Images from Naturhistorisches Museum Wien

monteiri
Butterflies described in 1885
Endemic fauna of São Tomé Island
Butterflies of Africa
Taxa named by Otto Staudinger
Taxa named by Ernst Schatz